Charli is a village in Ahore tehsil of Jalore District of Rajasthan state in India. It is situated on Jalore-Sanderao road (SH-16).

Demographics
Population of Charli is 3115 according to census 2001. Where male population is 1559 and the female population is 1556.

References

Charli Population

Villages in Jalore district